Metropolitan agriculture is a concept of how to successfully grow food in an urban environment.  It studies the linkage between areas such as sustainability, urbanization, urban agriculture, urban land use policies and agricultural change.

Description 
Metropolitan agriculture provides a conceptual framework for analysis of all the systems and processes through which agriculture manifests itself in urban areas. This goes beyond primary production to include distribution, processing, marketing and consumption. It can be seen as drawing on urban systems theory to understand the complex ways that agriculture contributes to, shapes, and is shaped by the process of urban development. This requires a spatial lens wider than the immediate urban environment, and the term 'metropolitan' attempts to convey a wider spatial boundary as well as wider conceptual focus.

TransForum 
TransForum is a Dutch foundation that works on sustainable agriculture. It has developed several pilot projects centered on re-connecting agriculture and cities while attempting to develop more sustainable agricultural systems and ventures. Out of this work emerged certain underlying characteristics and design principles as well as a larger conceptual framework for understanding the different ways that agriculture plays a part in urban development.

On a project level, TransForum used 'metropolitan agriculture' to convey an emphasis on systems integration in production processes, lowering external inputs by striving towards closed-loop systems, and multi-functionality in agricultural enterprises.

The Metropolitan Agriculture Innoversity is an initiative currently being launched by TransForum and Reos Partners, which convenes multi-stakeholder forums in cities worldwide to better utilize metropolitan resources and create more sustainable agriculture as well as urban development

See also 

 Urban agriculture
 Sustainable agriculture

References

External links 
 TransForum
 Metropolitan Agriculture
 Reos Partners
 Resources related to MetroAg, a course taught by Michigan State and Dutch instructors
 MetroAg on Delicious, social bookmarking site

Urban agriculture